Alexander Forbes Hendry (24 October 1908 – 18 November 1980) was a Scottish Conservative Party politician.

He was  Member of Parliament (MP) for  Aberdeenshire West from 1959 to 1966, when the seat was won by Liberal candidate James Davidson at the general election that year; with a majority of 1,195 votes and a 10% swing.

References

1908 births
1980 deaths
Scottish Conservative Party MPs
Unionist Party (Scotland) MPs
UK MPs 1959–1964
UK MPs 1964–1966
Argyll and Sutherland Highlanders officers
Recipients of the Military Cross
British Army personnel of World War II